"Irreplaceable" is a 2006 song by Beyoncé.

Irreplaceable may also refer to:

Music
Irreplaceable (George Benson album) or the title song, 2003
Irreplaceable (S.H.E album) or the title song, 2016
"Irreplaceable", a song by Kerri Ann, 1998
"Irreplaceable", a track by Vinnie Paul from the Hellyeah album Welcome Home, 2019

Other media
Irreplaceable (film), a 2016 French film
"Irreplaceable" (The Replacements), a television episode
Irreplaceable, a 2009 novel by Stephen Lovely